Rechtenstein is a municipality in the district of Alb-Donau in Baden-Württemberg in Germany.
The community belongs to the administrative community Munderkingen.

Geography

Geographical location
Rechtenstein is situated on the Danube between Riedlingen and Munderkingen.
The Braunsel flows here into the Danube.

Neighboring communities
The municipality is bordering to the east to Lauterach, in the south to Obermarchtal and to the east and north to Emeringen.

History
The castle Steinburg is the seat of the family from Stain. It was first mentioned in documents in 1331, as Berthold inhabited the castle from Stain.  On August 12, 1410 Wolf von Stain sold part of the place which had formed in the meantime around the castle, to Württemberg. Bernhard Stain acquires 1557 all shares castle and village back, so that the whole place is family owned again.
In 1806 the place finally fell to Württemberg. In 1817 the castle was demolished except for the castle tower.

Religions
Rechtenstein remained even after the Reformation Roman Catholic. The Baroque parish church of St. Georg was ordained 1744.

Politics

Crest
The coat of arms was approved on August 3, 1957 by the Ministry of Interior.
Blazon : "Argent, a continuous red cross, is superimposed with a gold heart shield, in three ousted Black Wolf fishing."

Buildings

Hydroelectric power plant on the Danube with turbine and factory building from 1905

Transportation
Rechtenstein lies on the Ulm–Sigmaringen railway. For many years no train stopped at Rechtenstein station, but currently 8 trains a day stop at the station throughout the year. Buses run to Munderkingen and Riedlingen. In addition, the Danube bike path from Donaueschingen to Vienna runs through Rechtenstein.

Literature
Description of the Oberamt Ehingen 1826, Reprint 1971 by Horst Bissinger publisher, Magstadt, digitized in Wikisource.

External links
Commons: Rechtenstein - collection of images, videos and audio files
Wikisource: Rechtenstein in the description of the Oberamts Ehingen 1826 - sources and full texts
Website of the municipality Rechtenstein: (in German) http://rechtenstein.de/

References

Towns in Baden-Württemberg
Alb-Donau-Kreis
Württemberg